The Dampier Archipelago is a group of 42 islands near the town of Dampier in the Pilbara, Western Australia.

The archipelago is also made up of reefs, shoals, channels and straits and is the traditional home of five Aboriginal language groups. It was formed 7000 years ago when rising sea levels flooded what were once coastal plains. The underlying rocks are among the oldest on earth, formed in the Archaean period more than 2400 million years ago.

It is named after William Dampier, an English buccaneer and explorer who visited in 1699. Dampier named one of the islands Rosemary Island.

Despite being a region through which considerable shipping and industrial activity occurs, the archipelago has considerable marine resources.

History
Dampier Archipelago is the site of some of Australia's oldest domestic structures, estimated to be between 8000 and 9000 years old.

The largest island (or peninsula) in the group was known as Murujuga by the Yaburara people. The first British settlers renamed it Dampier Island and it was later officially renamed Burrup Peninsula.

Indigenous heritage
The Yinidbarndi, Yaburara, Mardudhunera, and Woon-goo-tt-oo peoples have lived in the area for approximately 50,000 years.
In 1868, the area was the site of the Flying Foam massacre, in which between 20 and 150 members of the Yaburara are reported to have been killed.

Notes

References
 Chittleborough, R. G.,The Dampier Archipelago marine study : a progress report, Perth, W.A.: Dept.of Conservation and Environment, Bulletin 141. 1983.

 
Archipelagoes of Australia